Lucifer Peak is a  mountain summit located in the Valhalla Ranges of the Selkirk Mountains in southeast British Columbia, Canada. This peak's name was officially adopted July 26, 1977, by the Geographical Names Board of Canada. The peak is located in Devils Range, which is a subrange of the Valhallas. The names of the peaks of this small compact range have a devil-related theme: Black Prince Mountain, Mount Mephistopheles, Devils Dome, Mount Diablo, Satan Peak, Devils Spire, and Devils Couch. Based on the Köppen climate classification, Lucifer Peak has a subarctic climate with cold, snowy winters, and mild summers. The first ascent of the peak was made August 24, 1970, by Bob Dean and Howie Ridge via the east ridge.

Climbing Routes
Established climbing routes on Lucifer Peak:

 East Ridge -  First Ascent 1970
 Northwest Ridge -  FA 1980
 Southwest Face -  FA 1983

See also
Geography of British Columbia

References

External links
 Weather forecast: Lucifer Peak  

Two-thousanders of British Columbia
Selkirk Mountains
Kootenay Land District